Yukarıfındıklı can refer to:

 Yukarıfındıklı, Boğazkale
 Yukarıfındıklı, İspir